Route 645 is a  long mostly east–west secondary highway in the southwestern portion of New Brunswick, Canada. Most of the route is in New Maryland Parish.

The route starts at Route 640 in Hurley Corner where it travels south through Cork then travels east through Rooth. The route continues through Vespra where it runs parallel to the Oromocto River.  From here, the road is known as Rooth Road. It then ends in Tracy at Route 101.

History

See also

References

645
645